The Arkhangelsk Military District was a regional military district of the Red Army which oversaw the North-Western part of the Russian Soviet Federative Socialist Republic. The district was formed in 1940 during a reorganisation of the Army, but disbanded in 1944, reformed two years later, and finally disbanded in 1951.

First Formation 

In accordance with a decree dated 26 March 1940 from the Council of People's Commissars of the Soviet Union, the Arkhangelsk Military District was formed to oversee the Arkhangelsk Oblast, Murmansk Oblast, Nenets Autonomous Okrug, Vologda Oblast, and Komi Autonomous Soviet Socialist Republic. The new district's headquarters were established in Arkhangelsk on the basis of the 15th Army.

Second World War 
In July 1940 in Vologda the 29th Reserve Brigade was expanded into the 111th Rifle Division.

Sometime before the beginning of War on the Eastern Front, the Murmansk Oblast was transferred to the control of the Leningrad Military District along with the local air defences, air forces, and coastal defences. Personnel reports for 1 June 1941 report the district overseeing around 35,515 personnel.

On mobilisation the district formed the headquarters of the 28th Army. This army would go on to serve on the front but was completely destroyed trying to relieve the Smolensk Pocket.

The district was also due to form a Front however this order was cancelled at an unknown date.

In October 1941, in accordance with a directive issued by the STAVKA, a new Headquarters, 39th Army was setup in Arkhangelsk from personnel of the district. By February 1942 however this army was completely destroyed in the Kalinin Front.

Disbandment 
On 15 December1944 as part of a reorganisation of the military districts, the Arkhangelsk Military District was disbanded and subsequently reformed as the White Sea (Belomorsky) Military District. The district was reorganised following end of the "Arctic Front" or Second Soviet-Finnish War, and now included the Arkhangelsk Oblast, Komi Autonomous Soviet Socialist Republic, and Vologda Oblast. Throughout the war the district had been in charge with training reserves, guarding the White Sea coast, and ensuring the safety of the Arctic convoys travelling to Arkhangelsk, in addition to dispatching those supplies. However, following the end of the above-mentioned war, the need for two separate districts was removed. So, eventually, the White Sea District also absorbed the Murmansk Oblast and Karelo-Finnish Soviet Socialist Republic into its area of control.

Second Formation 

Following the end of the Second World War, the military districts were once again reorganised. On 29 January 1946 the first commander of the reformed Arkhangelsk Military District was appointed. The district was reformed by once again redesignating an army headquarters, this time from the 2nd Shock Army.

The district now consisted of the 69th Rifle Division and 77th Guards Rifle Division, both of which arrived back from Poland and East Germany respectively. The district was organized as follows:

 Headquarters, Arkhangelsk Military District, in Arkhangelsk, Arkhangelsk Oblast
 69th Rifle Division, in Vologda, Vologda Oblast (reduced to 25th Separate Rifle Brigade in 1941, expanded back to division strength in October 1953)
 77th Guards Rifle Division, in Arkhangelsk, Arkhangelsk Oblast (reduced to 10th Guards Separate Rifle Brigade, in 1946, expanded back to division in 1952)

As part of a decree dated 20 June 1951, the Arkhangelsk was finally disbanded when it was redesignated as the White Sea Military District. However, as part of a reform in 1956, which aimed to optimise the military districts, the minor districts were disbanded and reduced to "regional corps" part of a "larger district". Under this reorganisation, HQ White Sea Military District was disbanded and subsequently reformed as HQ, 44th Special Rifle Corps under control of the now expanded Leningrad Military District.

Commanders 
Commanders of the district included the following:

First Formation

 26 March 1940–April 1940, Lieutenant General Vladimir Nikolayevich Kurdyumov
 April 1940–June 1941, Lieutenant General Vladimir Kachalov
 June 1941–March 1942, Lieutenant General Vladimir Zakharovich Romanovsky
 March 1942–15 December 1944, Lieutenant General Trifon Ivanovich Shevaldin

Second Formation

 29 January 1946–March 1947, Colonel General Ivan Ivanovich Fedyuninsky
 March 1947–May 1949, Lieutenant General Vladimir Ivanovich Shcherbakov
 May 1949–June 1951, Colonel General Valerian Aleksandrovich Frolov

References

Notes

Bibliography 

 
 

1940 establishments in the Soviet Union
Military districts of the Soviet Union
Military units and formations established in 1940
Military units and formations disestablished in 1951
1951 disestablishments in the Soviet Union